Ching-a-Ring Chaw (sometimes Ching-a-Ring, or Ching-a-Ring Shaw) is a song from the early days of the minstrel show tradition.  A rewritten version frequently performed in modern times comes from Aaron Copland's 1952 Old American Songs song set.

Lyrics 
The precise lyrics vary, but they are generally approximately as follows:

History 
Ching-a-Ring Chaw's origin was as a blackface minstrel song. While arranging the piece for the second set of his Old American Songs, composer Aaron Copland made a point of rewriting the lyrics to efface any of the song's minstrel baggage: "I did not want to take any chance of it being construed as racist."

See also 
 List of blackface minstrel songs

References 

 Eileen Southern. The Music of Black Americans. Ed. 2. NY: W.W. Norton Co. 1983.
 Lynn Abbott, Doug Seroff. Out of Sight: The Rise of African American Popular Music, 1889-1895. pp. 93–96
 William A. Everett, Paul R. Laird. The Cambridge Companion to the Musical.
 Erroll G. Hill and James Hatch. A History of African-American Theater. Cambridge University Press 2003.
 -Hill, The American Stage: Social and Economic Issues from the Colonial Period to the Present, ed. Engle and Miller, Cambridge University Press. 1993
 Thomas L. Riis. "Musical Theater." The Garland Encyclopedia of World Music. 614– 623.
 Riis. "Minstrelsy and Theatrical Miscegenation." The Oxford Handbook of the American Musical. ed. Raymond Knapp, et al. Oxford University Press 2011. 66, 67, 72, 76.
 -Riis. Interview by the author. August 2015, University of Colorado, Boulder.
 -Riis. More than Just Minstrel Shows: The Rise of Black Musical Theatre at the Turn of the Century. (I.S.A.M. Monographs: Number 33.) Brooklyn: Institute for Studies in American Music, 1992.
 See also Susheel Bibbs, Voices for Freedom—Booklet:  A New Look at the Hyers Sisters' Dream, Change, and Legacy.  Amazon.com

Blackface minstrel songs
Year of song unknown
Songwriter unknown